Terry Owens may refer to:

 Terry Owens (American football), American football offensive lineman
 Terry Winter Owens, American composer and music educator